Two things are known as Augustine report:

 The 1990 report written by the Advisory Committee on the Future of the United States Space Program, chaired by Norman Augustine
 The 2009 report written by the Review of United States Human Space Flight Plans Committee, also chaired by Norman Augustine